Zatch Bell!, known formally by the Japanese title , is an anime based on the manga series  by Makoto Raiku. The television series revolves around the eponymous character, a Mamodo who, along with his human partner Kiyo Takamine, partakes in a tournament that will decide the ruler of his realm, the Mamodo world. Unlike the manga, the anime ends in a cliffhanger with only two Mamodo remaining. The series was directed by Tetsuji Nakamura and Yukio Kaizawa, and produced by Toei Animation.

The 150-episode series premiered on Japan's Fuji TV from April 6, 2003, to March 26, 2006, for three seasons. The English dub of the series was released in North America by Viz Media. It began airing on March 5, 2005, on Cartoon Network's Toonami in the United States, and was rerun on the network's daytime scheduling block Miguzi between May 15, 2006, and August 4, 2006. The series also aired on YTV's Bionix in Canada starting September 9, 2005. Cartoon Network dropped the series after episode 77 on January 20, 2007, while YTV continued airing it until December 6, 2008, after two seasons. Except for the first four episodes (101-104), the third season was not dubbed in English.

A total of ten theme music pieces are used for the episodes: three opening themes and seven closing themes in the original Japanese version; two opening and one ending theme in the English release. Several CDs containing the theme music and other tracks have been released by King Records. The series was released in fifty-one DVD compilations by Shogakukan between November 19, 2003, and March 7, 2007. As of July 2009, thirteen DVD compilations of the English adaption of the anime have been released by Viz Media between November 8, 2005, and December 4, 2007.

Series overview

Episode list

Season 1 (2003–2004)

Season 2 (2004–2005)

Season 3 (2005–2006)

Specials

Releases

Japan
DVD

Shogakukan (Region 2): Grouped by season

Blu-ray

United States
DVD

Notes

References 
General
 
 
 
 
 

Specific